José Melo de Carvalho Muniz Freire (July 13, 1861 – April 3, 1918) was a Brazilian politician.  He was the 10th president (governor) of the state of Espirito Santo, from 1892 to 1896, and again from 1900 to 1904.

Freire was born in Vitória.  He developed the railroads of the state, building the line from Vila Velha to Viana (which was later expanded to Cachoeiro do Itapemirin, from where it joined to the railroad to Rio de Janeiro), and greatly incentivated the European immigration to that State.  Espirito Santo got 15.586 immigrants from Germany, Italy and Balkans in the time of his term as governor.  He was also a Senator of the state of Espirito Santo in the Brazilian Senate (from 1904 to 1905 and from 1905 to 1914), and was the first Brazilian politician to defend the adoption of the secret vote (in Brazil, by that time, the vote was open; voter had to declare his vote for the electoral agent to take note of it).  The secret vote was only to be adopted in Brazil after 1930. The creation of the Electoral Court System and the first Election Code of Brazil goes back to 1932.

References

1861 births
1918 deaths
Governors of Espírito Santo
Members of the Federal Senate (Brazil)